Čelopeci is a village in the municipality of Kičevo, North Macedonia. It used to be part of the former Vraneštica Municipality.

Demographics
Čelopeci has traditionally been inhabited by a Muslim Macedonian (Torbeš) population.

According to the 2002 census, the village had a total of 318 inhabitants. Ethnic groups in the village include:

Turks 276
Macedonians 31
Albanians 10
Others 1

References

External links

Villages in Kičevo Municipality
Macedonian Muslim villages